Sarah Hamilton is a British historian and the associate dean for education at the University of Exeter.  Hamilton's research relates to the religious, social and cultural history of early medieval Europe from c. 900 to c. 1200, medieval liturgy and ritual, bishops, the delivery of pastoral care, penance, excommunication and heresy.

Selected publications
Church and People in the Medieval West, 900-1200, Pearson, Harlow, 2013.
Writing Medieval Biography, 750-1250, Boydell and Brewer, Woodbridge, 2006. (with J.C. Crick & D. Bates)
Defining the holy: sacred space in medieval and early modern Europe, Ashgate, Aldershot,  2005. (with A. Spicer)
The practice of penance, 900-1050, Boydell and Brewer, 2001.

References 

Living people

Year of birth missing (living people)

Academics of the University of Exeter

Alumni of the University of Cambridge
Alumni of the University of London